Stayko Nenov (born 17 January 1953) is a Bulgarian sports shooter. He competed in the mixed trap event at the 1980 Summer Olympics.

References

External links
 

1953 births
Living people
Bulgarian male sport shooters
Olympic shooters of Bulgaria
Shooters at the 1980 Summer Olympics
Place of birth missing (living people)